William Godshalk (October 25, 1817 – February 6, 1891) was a Republican member of the U.S. House of Representatives from Pennsylvania.

Biography
William Godshalk was born in East Nottingham Township, Pennsylvania.  He moved with his parents to Bucks County, Pennsylvania, in 1818.  He attended the common schools and Union Academy in Doylestown, Pennsylvania.  He learned the miller’s trade and in 1847 engaged in milling in Doylestown Township.  During the American Civil War he served in the Union Army as a private in Company K, One Hundred and Fifty-third Regiment, Pennsylvania Volunteer Infantry, from October 11, 1862, to July 23, 1863.

He was an unsuccessful candidate for election to the Pennsylvania State Senate in 1864.  He was elected as an associate judge of Bucks County in October 1871 and served five years.

Godshalk was elected as a Republican to the Forty-sixth and Forty-seventh Congresses.  He returned to milling, and died in New Britain, Pennsylvania.  Interment in the Presbyterian Church Cemetery in Doylestown.

References
The Political Graveyard
, Retrieved on 2008-02-14

Pennsylvania state court judges
People from Bucks County, Pennsylvania
Union Army soldiers
1817 births
1891 deaths
Republican Party members of the United States House of Representatives from Pennsylvania
19th-century American politicians
19th-century American judges